Karnaukhovo is the name of several rural localities in Russia:
Karnaukhovo, Beryozovskoye Rural Settlement, Beryozovsky District, Perm Krai, a village in Beryozovskoye Rural Settlement, Beryozovsky District, Perm Krai
Karnaukhovo, Zaboryinskoye Rural Settlement, Beryozovsky District, Perm Krai, a village in Zaboryinskoye Rural Settlement, Beryozovsky District, Perm Krai